Russians in Uzbekistan comprised the country's second-largest ethnic group after Uzbeks, numbering 1,653,478, in 1989 representing 5.5% of the population. During the Soviet period, Russians constituted more than half the population of the capital city, Tashkent. Uzbekistan counted nearly 1.5 million Russians, 12.5% of the population, in the 1970 census.

After the dissolution of the Soviet Union, significant emigration of ethnic Russians took place, mostly for economic reasons. Russians are concentrated in Tashkent, Bukhara and other major cities. The main religion is Russian Orthodoxy. Since 2014, 200,000 people have left to live in Russia, many citing discrimination and poor job opportunities.

By 2017, according to the Committee on Statistics of the Republic of Uzbekistan, about 750,000 Russians (2.3% of the population) lived in the country. At the same time, the bulk of Russians live in large cities, and most of them live in the capital, Tashkent. 

Russians and Tajiks in Uzbekistan face discrimination and racial violence.

See also 
 Demographics of Uzbekistan
 Uzbeks in Russia

References 

Russian diaspora in Asia
Ethnic groups in Uzbekistan